Life and Death of the Hollywood Kid (Hollywood Kid Eu Saeng-ae) is a 1994 South Korean drama film directed by Chung Ji-young. The film was selected as the South Korean entry for the Best Foreign Language Film at the 67th Academy Awards, but was not accepted as a nominee.

Cast
 Choi Min-soo as The Hollywood Kid

See also
 List of submissions to the 67th Academy Awards for Best Foreign Language Film
 List of South Korean submissions for the Academy Award for Best Foreign Language Film

References

External links
 

1994 films
1994 drama films
South Korean drama films
1990s Korean-language films
Grand Prize Paeksang Arts Award (Film) winners